Şevki Koru (1 April 1913 – 27 September 2003) was a Turkish long-distance runner. He competed in the marathon at the 1948 Summer Olympics.

References

1913 births
2003 deaths
Athletes (track and field) at the 1948 Summer Olympics
Turkish male long-distance runners
Turkish male marathon runners
Olympic athletes of Turkey
Place of birth missing